KPRM (870 AM) is a radio station in Park Rapids, Minnesota. It has a hybrid adult contemporary/conservative talk radio format. Locally, it broadcasts the popular "Coffee Talk" morning show, and is currently simulcasted on KDKK and KAKK.

National news comes from the CBS Radio Network, the classic country format (as well as Jim Bohannon's syndicated early-morning magazine America in the Morning) comes from Westwood One and the station also carries Premiere Networks' Clay Travis and Buck Sexton Show and The Sean Hannity Show.

On November 30, 2016, KPRM was granted an FCC construction permit to increase the night power to 2,500 watts.

In October 2021, KPRM changed its format from classic country to adult contemporary with the sale of KSKK to Gabriel Media. Morning programming remains virtually unchanged.

Ownership
KPRM transmits with 50,000 watts of power during the day, 1,000 watts at night, and is owned and operated by De La Hunt Broadcasting, through licensee EC Broadcasting.  The studios and offices are on the east side of Park Rapids, near the intersection of Highways 34 and 4.  Because WWL in New Orleans, Louisiana is the dominant Class A station on 870 AM, KPRM must reduce power during nighttime hours, preventing interference with the skywave signal of WWL.

In 2006, Ed and Carol De La Hunt were inducted into the Pavek Museum of Broadcasting Hall of Fame.

Sister stations
In addition to the Park Rapids properties (KPRM, KDKK 97.5, and KXKK 92.5), they also own KKWB 102.5 in Bemidji, Minnesota, KAKK 1570 and KQKK 101.9 in Walker, Minnesota.

References

https://www.northpine.com/blog/2021/10/19/two-longtime-northern-minnesota-radio-formats-combined/

External links
De La Hunt Broadcasting

Radio stations in Minnesota
Mainstream adult contemporary radio stations in the United States
Radio stations established in 1963
1963 establishments in Minnesota